David Čolina (born 19 July 2000) is a Croatian professional footballer who plays as a left back for German  club Augsburg.

Club career
Born in Zagreb, Čolina started training with Hrvatski Dragovoljac before moving to Dinamo Zagreb in 2008. In August 2018, he signed for Monaco.

Hajduk
On 22 July 2019, Čolina signed with Hajduk Split, on a four-year contract. On 28 July 2019 Čolina made his Hajduk debut, playing the full game as his side beat Varaždin 3–0 at Stadion Varteks in Round 2 of the 2019–20 Prva HNL.

Augsburg
On 14 January 2023, Čolina signed a contract with German club Augsburg until 30 June 2027.

He scored on his debut for the club with his first touch of the ball on January 22, 2023 vs Borussia Dortmund when he came on as a substitute.

Career statistics

Club

References

External links

David Čolina at hajduk.hr

2000 births
Living people
Footballers from Zagreb
Croatian footballers
Croatia youth international footballers
Croatia under-21 international footballers
Association football defenders
HNK Hajduk Split players
FC Augsburg players
Croatian Football League players
First Football League (Croatia) players
Bundesliga players
Croatian expatriate footballers
Expatriate footballers in Germany
Croatian expatriate sportspeople in Germany